Back Creek is a  river in the United States state of Virginia. It is a tributary of the Jackson River, part of the James River watershed.

See also 
 List of rivers of Virginia

References

Sources 
 USGS Hydrologic Unit Map - State of Virginia (1974)
 

Rivers of Virginia
Tributaries of the James River
Rivers of Bath County, Virginia
Rivers of Highland County, Virginia